The Canton of Darnétal is a canton situated in the Seine-Maritime département and in the Normandy region of northern France.

Geography 
An area of farmland and forests, with some light industry in the arrondissement of Rouen, centred on the town of Darnétal.

Composition 
At the French canton reorganisation which came into effect in March 2015, the canton was reduced from 19 to 15 communes:

Amfreville-la-Mi-Voie
Les Authieux-sur-le-Port-Saint-Ouen
Belbeuf
Bonsecours
Darnétal
Fontaine-sous-Préaux
Gouy
Quévreville-la-Poterie
Roncherolles-sur-le-Vivier
Saint-Aubin-Celloville
Saint-Aubin-Épinay
Saint-Jacques-sur-Darnétal
Saint-Léger-du-Bourg-Denis
Saint-Martin-du-Vivier 
Ymare

Population

See also 
 Arrondissements of the Seine-Maritime department
 Cantons of the Seine-Maritime department
 Communes of the Seine-Maritime department

References

Darnetal